Bernie Grundman (Born 16 December 1943, Minneapolis) is an American audio engineer.

He is most known for his mastering work and his studio, Bernie Grundman Mastering, which he opened in 1984 in Hollywood. The studio, which includes engineers Chris Bellman, Patricia Sullivan, and Mike Bozzi, mastered 37 projects which received Grammy Award nominations in 2005. In 1997 he opened a studio in Tokyo.

Grundman and his studio have both won numerous TEC Awards, including Best Mastering Facility and several production awards.

Previously, Grundman worked for Lester Koenig at Contemporary Records and then was head of the A&M Records mastering department in Los Angeles. Now his studio also has been established in Tokyo, Japan with engineer Yasuji Maeda.

Select works 

List is not complete.

See also
Airwolf Themes

References

External links
 Official site
 Mix magazine article on Grundman studio
 ProSoundNews article on 2005 Grammy nominations
 Palisadian-Post Interview
Interview with Bernie Grundman - NAMM Oral History Library (2011)

American audio engineers
Grammy Award winners
Living people
Mastering engineers
Year of birth missing (living people)